Ramakrishna Mission Vidyabhaban, Midnapore, is a higher secondary school located in Midnapore town, West Bengal, India. The Vidyabhavan is conducted by a managing committee appointed by the governing body of the Ramakrishna  Mission, Belur Math, Howrah, (W.B.).

About School 
The school follows the course curricula of West Bengal Board of Secondary Education (WBBSE) and West Bengal Council of Higher Secondary Education (WBCHSE) for Standard 10th and 12th Board examinations respectively.

See also
Education in India
List of schools in India
Education in West Bengal

References

External links
 

High schools and secondary schools in West Bengal
Schools in Paschim Medinipur district
Educational institutions established in 1948
1948 establishments in West Bengal